The Bernie Mac Show (often shortened to Bernie Mac in syndication) is  an American sitcom television series created by Larry Wilmore, that aired on Fox for five seasons from November 14, 2001 to April 14, 2006. The series featured Bernie Mac and his wife Wanda raising his sister's three kids: Jordan, Vanessa, and Bryana.

Premise
The series was loosely based on Mac's stand-up comedy acts. In real life, Bernie "Mac" McCullough was married with one daughter; Mac's character on the show (a stand-up comedian) was married with no children of his own. The pilot episode, aired on November 14, 2001, set up the basic premise for the series: the character Bernie Mac takes in his sister's children after she enters rehab (a fictional premise taken from one of Mac's stand-up routines which was eventually featured in the 2000 film, The Original Kings of Comedy). "In reality, the story is a blend of two real incidents: Mac briefly took in his niece Toya who was an at risk youth and her daughter Monique; while a friend of his had to raise her sister's children long-term."

Much of the humor in the show was derived from Mac's continual adjustment to and his unique take on parenthood. A frequent motif of the show was the juxtaposition of Mac's acerbic comments, such as his threats to "bust the (children's) heads 'til the white meat shows," and the parental affection he felt toward the trio, which often brought him to the verge of tears. Toward the end of the series, Bryana's long-lost father (Anthony Anderson) returns and drops by from occasionally to help Bernie and Wanda with the kids.

Many of his most emotional scenes occurred in segments in which Mac, while still in character, broke the 'fourth wall' and talked to the television audience, which he referred to as "America." This technique was notably used before an episode during the 2005–2006 season, when Bernie, as himself and wearing a Chicago White Sox cap and jacket, delivered a heartfelt congratulatory message to the baseball organization and its staff on their recent World Series Championship. Mac, who grew up on Chicago's south-side, was a die-hard fan of the White Sox and was seen at Game 1 of the World Series, in a front row seat.

Mac's character's celebrity worked as a plot device allowing other celebrities to appear on the show as themselves, including Serena Williams, Chris Rock, Ashton Kutcher, Billy Crystal, Carl Reiner, Don Rickles, Angela Bassett, Ellen DeGeneres, Ice Cube, Isaac Hayes, Flavor Flav, Lucy Lawless, Stone Cold Steve Austin, Triple H, Matt Damon, Charles Barkley, Jon Garland, Jules Sylvester, Sugar Ray Leonard, India Arie, Shaquille O'Neal, Sugar Shane Mosley, Hugh Hefner, Phil McGraw, and Marcus Allen.

Episodes

Characters

Main
 Bernard "Bernie" McCullough (Bernie Mac) – The show's main character who is loosely based on Mac. Bernie and his wife take in the three kids when their drug-addicted mother (Bernie's sister Stacy) is no longer able to be a proper parent. Bernie uses tough-love parenting tactics and he can be both strict and comical. He narrates the series, and between scenes, he talks to the audience by addressing them as "America." Although he loves all three kids, his favorite is Bryana (whom he affectionately calls "Baby Girl" because she is the youngest), and finds himself in conflict with teenage Vanessa, the eldest sibling, who has a poor attitude.
 Wanda "Baby" McCullough (Kellita Smith) – Bernie's loving wife, an intelligent woman who is vice president for AT&T. She loves raising the kids with Bernie, but periodically her patience is tested. Whenever Bernie has a problem, she does her best to help, though her assistance can be stubbornly overbearing and unnecessary at times.
 Jordan Jay Thomkins (Jeremy Suarez) – Bernie and Wanda's nephew, the middle child. Jordan is very mischievous and peculiar. He is interested in collecting bugs and conducting odd science experiments. He gets beat up by his little sister, Bryana, and early on in the series he would cry, occasionally vomit, and sometimes urinate on himself. As the series progresses, he becomes tougher, and  joins the wrestling team.
 Bryana "Baby Girl" Thomkins (Dee Dee Davis) – Bernie and Wanda's younger niece, the youngest child and the half-sister of Jordan and Vanessa. Bryana is a friendly little girl who is sweet, innocent, and naive, though she is often more bratty and obnoxious as the series progresses. Bryana is her uncle's favorite, and has a trusting relationship with her Uncle Bernie. Bernie fears that one day she will grow up and end up like Vanessa.
 Vanessa "Nessa" Thomkins (Camille Winbush) – Bernie and Wanda's elder niece, and the eldest of the three children. Vanessa purposely gives Bernie trouble with her attitude, most of which comes from the pressure of being the eldest and having to take the parent role with her younger siblings. As the series progresses, she gets along better with Bernie.

Recurring
 W.B. (Reginald Ballard) – Bernie's friend who's always on his side
 Bonita (Niecy Nash) – Bernie's younger sister (seasons 2–4)
 Chuy (Carlos Mencia (season 1) and Lombardo Boyar) – Bernie's friend
 Kelly (Michael Ralph) – Bernie's friend
 Jerry Best (Rick Hoffman) – Bernie's Manager
 Father Sean Cronin (Wade Williams) – The Dean of Discipline at Jordan and Bryana's school
 Bryan (Anthony Anderson) – Bryanna's father (season 5)
 Donna (Naya Rivera) – Vanessa's friend
 Teri (Ashley Monique Clark) – Vanessa's friend (guest, season 3; recurring, seasons 4–5)

Unseen characters
 Stacey Thomkins – One of two of Bernie's sisters and Vanessa, Jordan, and Bryana's mother. Before the events of the show, she became addicted to drugs; Bernie had to place her in an institution to recover and took in her children until the time came she could care for them herself. Though institutionalized, Stacey's addiction was such that she was not known to make any serious attempts to recover and her children remain with Bernie for the run of the series. A picture of her younger self is seen once in "Road to Traditions".
 Mr. Thomkins – Vanessa and Jordan's biological father, who left them when she was five years of age and he was a baby. According to Bernie and Vanessa, he's in prison for various law violations that include gun violence. His picture is shown in the episode "Saving Sergeant Thomkins".
 Big Mama – Bernie's grandmother. She died sometime before Bernie became famous. She is frequently mentioned by Bernie over the course of the series. In the family reunion episode, Bebe Drake played the matriarchal role.
 Uncle Ellister – Bernie's uncle who is, in actuality, his biological father.

Production

Main crew
 Creator and executive producer: Larry Wilmore
 Executive producers: Pete Aronson, Warren Hutcherson.
 Co-executive producers: Bernie Mac, Richard Appel, Teri Schaffer, Michael Benson, Marc Abrams.
 Producers: Michael Petok, Steven Greener

Cancellation
After five seasons and 104 episodes, Fox announced the cancellation of The Bernie Mac Show.

The series finale titled "Bernie's Angels" focused on Bernie getting an electrical shock and ends up traumatized. After he recovers, he begins to teach Jordan and Bryanna how to do certain things on their own. Also, Vanessa doesn't want Bernie to be involved in her choosing a college. Meanwhile, Jordan takes advantage of Bernie's kindness. In the end, Vanessa and Bernie make up (mainly due to her writing an essay about who inspires her most: which is him). In the final scene of the series, Bernie goes back to his normal self and takes back the iPod he bought Jordan since he was taking advantage of him. Bernie's final line is a farewell message to the viewers and stating that he is going to continue to raise and teach the kids for as long as they need it and he also wishes the viewers luck. The scene pans out with Jordan on his knees sobbing and begging for the iPod while Bernie smugly laughs and teases him.

Broadcast history
The series debuted in its time slot on November 14, 2001, with solid ratings in spite of a weak lead-in, Grounded for Life. The show had a very successful first season and in the process won a handful of honors including an Emmy Award for "Outstanding Writing for a Comedy Series" and the prestigious Peabody Award. Bernie Mac also received Emmy and Golden Globe nominations for Best Actor in a Comedy Series.

In fall 2002, the series aired against the Damon Wayans comedy My Wife and Kids which may have hurt the show's momentum in the ratings during the first half of its second season run. Larry Wilmore, the show's creator and executive producer, was fired at this time. In interviews, Wilmore said he was fed up with the network's creative interference with the show, in addition to Fox constantly shuffling it around the schedule. Fox contended that it wasn't happy with the show's direction under Wilmore in the second season, claiming the show "wasn't delivering enough laughs". With The Bernie Mac Show'''s inability to topple My Wife and Kids in the Wednesday 8 p.m. timeslot, Fox eventually aired the show after American Idol, after which it received its highest ratings ever.

The third season was scheduled to start on October 29, 2003, but was postponed due to The O.C. being moved. Instead, the series started the season at the late date of November 30, 2003. The ratings were mediocre, despite the large ratings of its lead-in The Simpsons. In March 2004, the show was moved to Monday nights in a plan to boost ratings for the new show Cracking Up, but the ratings were low for both shows. Cracking Up was canceled and The Bernie Mac Show was pulled from May Sweeps with leftover episodes that aired in June (one of which included an episode about Thanksgiving).The Bernie Mac Show returned to its original time slot on September 8, 2004, to start the fourth season. The production was shut down a month later due to Bernie's sickness. The show returned on January 14, 2005, with new episodes on Friday nights. Although the ratings were low enough that commentators questioned the show's future (especially when it was postponed from May Sweeps again), the show was renewed for a fifth season.

The fifth season started September 23, 2005, on Friday nights and beginning mid-season, airings were followed by reruns of the show.The Bernie Mac Show celebrated its 100th episode on February 3, 2006, even though the actual 100th episode was not aired until March 31.

Syndication and international broadcast
The series had been airing in syndication since September 2005 and aired on Independent Fox UPN and The WB affiliates (the letter networks The WB 100+ Station Group also carries the program as part of its national schedule) and was on the FX network from September 2008 until 2011. In syndication, the series' title is shortened simply to Bernie Mac. Bernie Mac's hometown of Chicago aired the series on the city's independent station The U. The Bernie Mac Show began its run on the station in September 2005. In the beginning of fall 2009, the series briefly moved to The U's sister station Me-TV, before returning to The U where it remained until late 2010.

On the day of Mac's funeral, The U aired a retrospective TV special called A Tribute to Bernie Mac, which featured clips from the series and an interview with Camille Winbush, who portrayed Vanessa.

Reruns of the show were also aired on Much in Canada. The show aired in Jamaica on CVM Television.

Home media

The Season One DVD boxset was released on DVD May 4, 2004.

Reception

American ratings

Awards and nominationsThe Bernie Mac Show'' won a Peabody Award in 2001, the Humanitas Prize, a Primetime Emmy Award, three NAACP Image Awards for Outstanding Comedy Series, and was honored by the Television Critics Association.

For his role in the show, Bernie Mac was honored by the Television Critics Association for Individual Achievement in a Comedy as well as the NAACP Image Award for Outstanding Actor in a Comedy Series four years in a row: 2003, 2004, 2005, and 2006.

References

External links
 
 

2000s American black sitcoms
2000s American single-camera sitcoms
2001 American television series debuts
2006 American television series endings
English-language television shows
Cultural depictions of American men
Cultural depictions of actors
Cultural depictions of comedians
Fox Broadcasting Company original programming
Peabody Award-winning television programs
Primetime Emmy Award-winning television series
Television series about children
Television series about families
Television series by 20th Century Fox Television
Television shows set in Los Angeles
Television series created by Larry Wilmore